Claoxylon australe, known as brittlewood is a common rainforest shrub or understorey tree. The habitat is all types of eastern Australian rainforests. The natural range of distribution is from Eden (37° S) in south eastern New South Wales to Bowen (20° S) in tropical Queensland.

Description
A shrub or small tree growing to 9 metres in height and a trunk diameter of 30 cm. The trunk is cylindrical or somewhat flanged at the butt in larger plants. Bark is fawnish brown or grey, fairly smooth with some lines of vertical bumps and other irregularities. Branchlets often hairy, green turning to fawn with lenticels.

Leaves alternate, simple and toothed in an irregular manner. Oblong or elliptical in shape, 5 to 12 cm long with a blunt leaf tip. Leaf stalks 1 to 4 cm long. Usually with two small glands at the apex. The midrib is paler than the leaf itself, venation is more evident under the leaf.

Greenish flowers form on racemes in the months of October to November. Male and female flowers on separate plants, being dioecious. The fruit matures in January to March, being a purple/black capsule. Globular in shape, 6 mm in diameter. Within each of the three lobes of the capsule is one red warty seed. Its fruit is eaten by the brown cuckoo-dove and Australian king parrot.

References

  (other publication details, included in citation)
 NSW Flora Online http://plantnet.rbgsyd.nsw.gov.au/cgi-bin/NSWfl.pl?page=nswfl&lvl=sp&name=Claoxylon~australe retrieved 7 August 2009

Acalypheae
Malpighiales of Australia
Trees of Australia
Flora of New South Wales
Flora of Queensland
Taxa named by Henri Ernest Baillon